Blake Wallace (born 18 June 1992) is a retired Australian professional rugby league footballer who played as a stand-off or scrum-half for the Leigh Centurions in the Betfred Super League.

He previously for the Toronto Wolfpack in League 1, Betfred Championship and the Super League.

Background
Wallace was born in Wollongong, New South Wales, Australia. 

He played his junior rugby league for the Dapto Canaries.

Playing career

Central Queensland Capras
Wallace played for the Central Queensland Capras in the Queensland Cup.

Illawarra Cutters
He also played for the Illawarra Cutters in the NSW Cup.

Toronto Wolfpack
He made his professional debut for the Toronto Wolfpack in the Challenge Cup in 2017.

Wallace played in both 2018 RFL Championship and 2019 RFL Championship.

Leigh Centurions
When the Toronto club folded in mid-2020 (primarily due to the disruption caused to fixtures and attendance by the COVID-19 pandemic), Wallace was signed up by the Leigh Centurions. He only played three games with Leigh Centurions before suffering a concussion that forced him to be medically retired.

Post-playing career

Dapto Canaries
In late 2022 he took up the role of head-coach of Dapto Canaries.

References

External links
Toronto Wolfpack profile
Central Queensland Capras profile

1992 births
Living people
Australian rugby league coaches
Australian rugby league players
Central Queensland Capras players
Illawarra Cutters players
Leigh Leopards players
Rugby league five-eighths
Rugby league halfbacks
Rugby league players from Wollongong
Toronto Wolfpack players